Gangnam District is one of the 25 local government districts which make up the city of Seoul, South Korea. Gangnam  translates to "South of the (Han) River". As of the 2017 census, Gangnam District had a population of 561,052. There is a high concentration of wealth in the district, with prices for an apartment as of 2020 nearly double those in the rest of Seoul. Gangnam district is generally referred to as a part of Gangnam School District Eight (강남 8학군), along with Seocho District. This district shares half of Gangnam-daero Gangnam Station area with Seocho District, which is one of the most crowded places in Korea.

Administration
Gangnam is one of two gu that make up the Greater Gangnam Area with neighboring Seocho District.  

The Gangnam District office has designated two smoke-free zones within the district. The first is the section of Gangnam Boulevard between exit No. 2 of Gangnam station of Seoul Subway Line 2 and exit No. 5 of Sinnonhyeon station of Line 9; the second is the 836-meter (914-yard) section of sidewalk along Yeongdong Boulevard from exit No. 5 of Samseong station on Line 2, outside COEX Convention & Exhibition Center and ASEM Tower of the COEX complex.

Divisions

Gangnam District is composed of 26 dong (neighborhoods):

 Apgujeong
 Cheongdam 1
 Cheongdam 2
 Daechi 1
 Daechi 2
 Daechi 3
 Daechi 4
 Dogok 1
 Dogok 2
 Gaepo 1
 Gaepo 2
 Gaepo 3
 Irwon 1
 Irwon 2
 Irwon bon
 Nonhyeon 1
 Nonhyeon 2
 Samseong 1
 Samseong 2
 Segok
 Sinsa
 Suseo
 Yeoksam 1
 Yeoksam 2

Economy

Both the Greater Gangnam Area and Gangnam itself are widely known for its heavily concentrated wealth and very high standard of living, which has been compared to cities such as Beverly Hills, California. The most significant indicator is its extremely expensive real estate. Seoul as a whole is known for its expensive housing prices—as of 2011, its average apartment cost approximately US$5,500 per m2—but the average price in Gangnam is almost twice as high, roughly US$10,000 per m2, which is 3.5 times the nationwide average. This is driven in part by the price of land: the 40 km2 making up Gangnam district rivals in valuation with the entirety of the city of Busan, the second-largest city in South Korea which occupies 770 km2. Combined with the neighboring districts of Seocho and Songpa, the Greater Gangnam Area accounts for almost 10% of the land value of the entire country.

While Seoul's traditional business centers such as Central District, Jongno District, Yongsan District and Yeongdeungpo District still maintain their leading roles, Gangnam and its neighboring districts have swiftly become the new core across all areas of business over the last few decades. KOSPI 200 companies based in Gangnam district include KEPCO, GS Group, Hyundai Department Store Group, HITEJinro, Hansol, Hankook Tire, GLOVIS and Korea Zinc Corporation. Besides, POSCO also operates POSCO Center in Teheran Valley, and KT&G operates Kosmo Tower. Other notable companies based in Gangnam include Dongbu Fire Insurance, Young Poong Group, T'way Airlines and Hankook P&G. Gangnam is also home to many IT and other internet-related companies including NC Soft and Pandora TV, and is also a strong hub of the country's financial and banking sectors. Many international companies also operate key offices in Gangnam, including Google, IBM, Toyota, and AMI.

Since January 2012, the area has also been home to FNC Entertainment, which moved into its own company offices in Cheongdam-dong, separate from its parent company in the CJ E&M Music Performance Division Building in neighbouring Apgujeong-dong. Other entertainment companies located there include SM Entertainment, JYP Entertainment (until 2018), Cube Entertainment, Pledis Entertainment, LOEN Entertainment, Source Music, Plan A Entertainment, DSP Media, MBK Entertainment, Nega Network, C-JeS Entertainment, WM Entertainment, NH Media, J. Tune Entertainment, TOP Media, Happy Face Entertainment, Dream Tea Entertainment, Polaris Entertainment, Jellyfish Entertainment, DR Music, Stardom Entertainment, and HYBE Corporation.

The Korean subsidiary of American Megatrends, AMI Korea, is headquartered in Daechidong, Gangnam District.

Economic development
Until the early 1980s Gangnam and its neighboring areas had remained the least developed in Seoul, but prodigious development over the last 30 years has earned it a reputation of being one of the most affluent, dynamic, and influential areas in both Seoul and South Korea as a whole.

In addition, the COEX Convention & Exhibition Center in Gangnam recently hosted several international conferences such as the 2010 G-20 summit and the 2012 Nuclear Security Summit.

Education
South Korea is known for its high standard of education and intense competition for university entrance, and Gangnam is considered the national capital of education, which is one of the decisive factors to make Gangnam the most attractive destination in South Korea. In 2010, roughly 6% of the successful candidates to Seoul National University, which is considered the best university in South Korea, were from Gangnam district, while Gangnam's population makes up only 1% of the country's population. In 2008, 22.7 out of 1,000 students in Gangnam district went abroad to study, while the nation's average ratio in the same time frame was only 3.6 per 1,000 students. Following the substantial raising of the profile of the Gangnam district internationally, the area has become a popular destination for international students seeking Korean language lessons, marking the rise of Korea as a 'study tourism' destination. Both long-standing locally owned schools such as the Seoul Korean Academy, and more recent foreign-owned entities such as Lexis Korea report a significant increase in interest in the location.

International schools:
  (한국외국인학교)
  (서울아카데미국제학교)

Former schools
 Japanese School in Seoul

Attractions

The important business district around Teheranno (Tehran Street) runs east–west from Gangnam station to Samseong station and the COEX Convention & Exhibition Center-Korean World Trade Center complex. Several popular shopping and entertainment areas are located in Gangnam District, including Apgujeong, the COEX Mall and the area around Gangnam station and Garosugil.

Cheongdam-dong is notable as an upmarket shopping area, with stores of global and local luxury brands, such as MCM Haus flagship store; Vera Wang's third global and first Asian flagship store 'Vera Wang Bridal Korea'; as well as French jeweler Cartier's Cartier Maison, located on Apgujeong-ro, which is the largest in Korea and at the time of opening, in 2008, the seventh largest in the world.

The area has a large concentration of vegetarian and other upscale restaurants that serve Korean cuisine with a modern twist, namely on the main street from Bongeun Temple to Park Hyatt Hotel in Samseong-dong.

 Galleria Department Store
 Seolleung and Jeongneung tombs
 Trade Tower
 Apgujeong Rodeo street
 Sinsa Garosugil
 COEX Mall
 COEX Aquarium
 Kukkiwon (World Taekwondo Headquarters)

 Korea City Air Terminal
 Simone Handbag Museum
 Bongeun Temple, close to COEX Mall
 Dosan Park
 Metasequoia Road
 Nonhyun Furniture Road
 Yangjae Stream

Transportation
Gangnam District is served by Seoul Subway Line 2, Seoul Subway Line 3, Seoul Subway Line 7, Seoul Subway Line 9, Bundang Line and the Shinbundang Line.

 Korail
Bundang Line
 (Seongdong-gu) ← Apgujeongrodeo – Gangnam-gu Office – Seonjeongreung – Seolleung — Hanti — Dogok — Guryong — Gaepo-dong — Daemosan — Suseo → (Songpa-gu)
 Seoul Metro
Seoul Subway Line 2 Euljiro Circle Line
(Songpa-gu) ← Samseong — Seolleung — Yeoksam — Gangnam → (Seocho-gu)
Seoul Subway Line 3
(Seongdong-gu) ← Apgujeong — Sinsa → (Seocho-gu) ← Maebong — Dogok — Daechi — Hangnyeoul — Daecheong — Irwon — Suseo – (Songpa-gu)
 Shinbundang Line
(Seocho-gu) ← Gangnam
Seoul Subway Line 7
(Gwangjin-gu) ← Cheongdam — Gangnam-gu Office — Hak-dong — Nonhyeon → (Seocho-gu)
 Metro 9 corporation
Seoul Subway Line 9
(Seocho-gu) ← Sinnonhyeon ← Eonju ← Seonjeongneung ← Samseong Jungang ← Bongeunsa

Festivals
There are several festivals held in Gangnam District.
 International Peace Marathon Festival in October
 Gangnam Fashion Festival in October
 Sports Festival for residents in Gangnam Distinct in May
 Daemosan Festival

Following the anti-American protests in Seoul in the early 2000s, the local authorities in the Gangnam District have organized various cultural and sporting events, such as the International Peace Marathon, jointly with the United States Forces Korea. In 2009 they were awarded a 'special prize' by the US Army for promoting cultural exchanges with American troops.

Popular culture
 The Caffè Pascucci coffee chain in Apgujeong-dong was used as one of the main filming locations for Seoul Broadcasting System's 2001 drama Beautiful Days, starring Lee Byung-hun, Choi Ji-woo, Ryu Si-won, Shin Min-a, Lee Jung-hyun and Lee Yoo-jin.
 Several subway stations in Gangnam and nearby areas were used as filming locations for the 2012 Hollywood film The Bourne Legacy, the fourth installment in the Bourne film series.
 The 2012 K-pop song "Gangnam Style" by South Korean entertainer Psy was inspired by the lifestyle of the Gangnam region and its music video was shot in the aforementioned location. The song and video's popularity increased international awareness of the district. In the music video, Psy can be seen dancing on top of the ASEM Tower with the Trade Tower in the background. The two buildings are part of World Trade Center Seoul (WTC Seoul), also known as COEX.
 In December 2012, Cheongdam-dong was the setting for the SBS weekend drama series, Cheongdam-dong Alice. It stars Moon Geun-young, Park Si-hoo, So Yi-hyun and Kim Ji-seok and is based on the novel, Cheongdamdong Audrey.
 In May 2013, the Cheongdam-dong branch of 10 Corso Como was used as a filming location for the music video of Psy's single "Gentleman".
 The webtoon My ID is Gangnam Beauty (내 ID는 강남미인!) by Gi Maeng-gi, which is about a girl who underwent plastic surgery due to being bullied because of her appearance, was released on Naver Webtoon in 2016. Its title referred to the namesake district being called the "Mecca of plastic surgery", with the term "Gangnam beauty" being used as a pejorative term to those who undergo the process. In 2018, generalist pay TV channel JTBC aired a television drama adaptation of the webtoon which was produced by ACC Korea.

Twin towns – sister cities

Gangnam District is twinned with:

 Chaoyang (Beijing), China
 Gwinnett County, United States
 Licheng (Jinan), China
 Riverside, United States
 Woluwe-Saint-Pierre, Belgium
 Zhongshan (Dalian), China
 Buyeo, South Korea
 Boseong, South Korea
 Cheongdo, South Korea
 Cheorwon, South Korea
 Ganghwa, South Korea
 Gapyeong, South Korea
 Goesan, South Korea
 Gunsan, South Korea
 Paju, South Korea
 Sangju, South Korea
 Sinan, South Korea
 Tongyeong, South Korea
 Yangpyeong, South Korea
 Yeongju, South Korea
 Yeongdo (Busan), South Korea
 Yeongdong, South Korea

See also
 List of districts of Seoul
 Administrative divisions of Gangnam District
 Fashion in South Korea

References

External links

 Gangnam-gu website 
 https://www.gangnam.go.kr/global/main.do?lang=en Gangnam-gu website] 
 Gangnam-gu > Tourism / Culture > Maps (Gangnam-gu maps)
  Map, status quo and origin of dong names of Gangnam-gu
 "Tour The Ritzy Seoul District That Inspired Viral Hit 'Gangnam Style'", photoessay at BusinessInsider.com, 20 September 2012
 Gangnam Street Videoclip

 
Districts of Seoul